Raffles Place MRT station is an underground Mass Rapid Transit (MRT) interchange station on the North South Line (NSL) and East West Line (EWL) in Singapore. Located in the Downtown Core, the station is underneath Raffles Place, the centre of Singapore's financial district, south of the Singapore River. The station serves various landmarks including Merlion Park and the Asian Civilisations Museum and various commercial buildings such as One Raffles Place and OCBC Centre.

Initially named Central MRT station, the station was part of the early plans for the original MRT network since 1982. Construction of the tunnels between the City Hall and Raffles Place stations required the draining of the Singapore River. The station opened on 12 December 1987 with the MRT extension to Outram Park station. Cross-platform transfers between the NSL and EWL began on 28 October 1989, ahead of the opening of the MRT eastern line extension to Tanah Merah station on 4 November which split the MRT network into two lines.

The station has ten entrances, with three of them adopting colonial-style facades. Three artworks are displayed at the station: two murals by Lim Sew Yong and Thang Kiang How depict scenes of Singapore's history, while Aw Tee Hong's sculpture takes inspiration from Chinese junks.

History
The station, then named Central, was included in the early plans of the MRT network in May 1982. It was renamed to Raffles Place in November that year as the business district it serves would be called Raffles Place.  It was to be constructed as part of the Phase I MRT segment from the Novena to Outram Park stations; this segment was planned to be completed by December 1987. This segment was given priority as it passes through areas that had a higher demand for public transport, such as the densely populated housing estates of Toa Payoh and Ang Mo Kio and the Central Area. The line aimed to relieve the traffic congestion on the Thomson–Sembawang road corridor.

Train services commenced on 12 December 1987 when the line's extension to Outram Park station was completed. The station was part of a route that ran continuously from Yishun station in the north to Lakeside station in the west. From 28 October 1989, it began to serve the North South line (NSL) as well as the East West line (EWL) when MRT operations were split. In September 2000, the Land Transport Authority (LTA) installed lifts to allow barrier-free access to the station.

Station construction
The contract for the construction of the station was awarded to a joint venture comprising Taisei Corporation, Shimizu and Marubeni at S$70.723 million (US$ million in ) in May 1984. Construction of the station began on 28 May 1984. The station was built right in the city centre. With a short construction schedule, the various stages of construction had to be overlapped. This required coordination between various subcontractors while overcoming space constraints at the site. The buildings of the Standard Chartered Bank and the Indian Overseas Bank had to be demolished as well as an underground carpark. During the diversion of utilities at the site, the contractors used the utilities departments' records to determine the location of utilities; they were found to be inaccurate and outdated during surveying.

The soil conditions at the site consisted of silty clay in between sandstone with boulders of varying sizes. With the high-rise buildings in the area, it was difficult to determine suitable locations for the installation of temporary ground support systems (including the piles and working deck). About 450 piles were installed in pre-bored holes that supported the station's temporary work deck covering 40% of the site. The piles were installed via rock augers that penetrated into boulders, supplemented by using a "down-the-hole" (DTH) percussion machine.

Before the piles were installed, grout was injected via a central tube in the rock auger to stabilise the soil. Due to the instability of the rock auger when drilling into the boulders, the size of the drilling holes had to be minimised as much as possible. The DTH machine pre-bored the holes before allowing the augers to drill into the ground; this slowed down drilling rates. As the DTH machine was intended to drill in only hard ground, the machine becomes bogged in wet weather due to the machine's inability to discharge the drill cuttings (mud slurry). An air lift and a tremie pipe at the bottom of the drilling hole were used to remove the mud slurry. During the station's excavation, the boulders had to be broken apart, through treatment with a cracking agent, hydraulic rock splitters or giant breakers. Some boulders were removed via explosives; this had to be used with caution due to the surrounding buildings. While the boulders were hard, they were brittle and easily broken.

In conjunction with the station's opening, private developers constructed newer buildings that re-established Raffles Place area as a financial hub. The presence of the MRT station near these buildings also created additional convenience for corporations and banks operating in the area.

Construction of tunnels
The contract for the construction of four  tunnels between the City Hall and Raffles Place stations was awarded to a joint venture between Kajima Corporation and Keppel Shipyard in October 1983 at S$35.65 million (US$ million in ). Another contract for the construction of  tunnels between the Maxwell (now Tanjong Pagar) and Raffles Place stations was awarded to a joint Japanese consortium including Taisei, Shimizu and Marubeni in December that year. The S$63.388 million (US$ million in ) contract included the construction of the adjacent Maxwell station.

The tunnel route between Raffles Place and Maxwell stations goes along Robinson Road. Cement grouting was used to strengthen the soil along the road. This is to ensure the buildings above ground were unaffected by the works underneath. Ground treatment of the soil began on 28 May 1984 and completed by April the following year.

The construction of tunnels between the City Hall and Raffles Place stations required the draining of the Singapore River. The contractor used the cut-and-cover construction method since the tunnels, which cross over one another, would pass through a shallow part of the river. The tunnel boring machine was launched from Empress Place, which is just by the river bank. Due to the acidity of the Singapore River, a layer of concrete was added to the concrete frame around the tunnels, with a waterproofing additive for the base slab concrete. The concrete frame was designed to prevent any corrosion or floatation of the tunnels.

Due to requirements from the Ministry of Environment that the work site does not occupy more than 40% of the river width, the work proceeded in three stages. However, this restriction led to a limited work area. The piles installation was hindered by the boulders in the river, which had to be drilled through. The works were close to the historical monuments of the Immigration Building and the Cavenagh Bridge. These two sites had to be closely monitored for any ground movement. Monitoring instruments such as inclinometers and levelling pins were used for any structural movement.

There were concerns that the Cavenagh Bridge would not be able to absorb any significant strains with the settlement of the bridge's anchor blocks. Saddles, joined by prestressing cables, were placed on either side of the bridge to unload and loosen the links and bridge wedges. However, these wedges could not be loosened. Instead, other temporary supports were placed to relieve any stress on the bridge. After finding some cracks on the entrance façade of the Immigration Building, the contractors underpinned the columns at the entrance.

The first stage of the construction was completed in May 1985, with a delay of seven months. To speed up the construction, the Environment Ministry agreed to lift restrictions on the work area. The rest of the construction was completed in one stage, taking up the remaining  of the river width. The subsequent stage also used fewer piles with the mixed use of cut slopes. Installation of the 2nd stage cofferdam began in May and works were completed within 12 months.

Station details

Raffles Place station is one of two stations which are paired cross-platform interchanges between the NSL and EWL. From the north, the station is after City Hall station. To the south, both lines diverge from this station, with the NSL going towards Marina Bay station while the EWL goes towards Tanjong Pagar station. The official station code is NS26/EW14. It is within walking distance to the Downtown and Telok Ayer stations on the Downtown Line.

Like the adjacent City Hall station, it has two platform levels to facilitate its role as an interchange between the NSL and EWL. Before the MRT eastern extension to Tanah Merah station and the Marina Bay southern extension on 4 November 1989, through services operated from the Yishun to Lakeside stations. A few days before the opening, on 28 October, transfer drills were launched for commuters to familiarise themselves with transferring between the two services: with passengers from Yishun having to alight at either Raffles Place or City Hall to continue their journey to Lakeside or vice versa. In addition to advertisement campaigns and guides about the transfers, Mass Rapid Transit Corporation (MRTC) staff were deployed at the platforms to help commuters.

With an additional shopping floor, the station has a total of four basement levels. The station has ten entrances. Three of the entrances' facades are inspired by various colonial-style buildings that once existed in the area, such as the John Little department store building and the old Mercantile Bank. These entrances serve various landmarks and commercial developments in the area including Raffles Place Park, Merlion Park, Asian Civilisations Museum, Telok Ayer Market, The Fullerton Hotel, One Raffles Place, Prudential Tower, OCBC Centre and Raffles Quay.

Two murals by Lim Sew Yong and Thang Kiang How are displayed at the station, as part of the MRTC's S$2 million (US$ million in ) commission of artworks at six MRT stations along the NSL. These murals on vitreous enamel panels depicts scenes of Singapore's history. Another brass sculpture Struggle for Survival by Aw Tee Hong is displayed outside the station. The sculpture takes inspiration from the Chinese junks and the perahu, linked to people's livelihoods of Singapore's past. The artist felt the ships best reflected Singapore's pioneering spirit through the hardship the early immigrants faced and decided to incorporate the shapes into the work.

Notes and references

Footnotes

References

Bibliography

External links
 

Railway stations in Singapore opened in 1987
Raffles Place
Downtown Core (Singapore)
Mass Rapid Transit (Singapore) stations